Baptism in Kansas is a 1928 painting by the American painter John Steuart Curry. It depicts a full-submersion baptism in a water tank. In the sky are a raven and a dove, a reference to the birds Noah released from the Ark. The painting is based on a scene Curry witnessed in 1915, when the creeks were dried up and the water tank was the only suitable site for the baptism. It was painted in August 1928.

The painting was first exhibited at the Eleventh Biennal Exhibition of Contemporary American Oil Paintings at the Corcoran Gallery of Art in Washington, D.C. It was bought by Gertrude Vanderbilt Whitney in 1930, and has belonged to the Whitney Museum of American Art since its inauguration in 1931. The painting launched Curry to national fame and is one of the most iconic paintings of the American Regionalist movement.

The critic Thomas Craven wrote about the painting: "There was no burlesque in the picture, no satire, no sophisticated fooling. It was conceived in reverence and spiritual understanding, and executed with an honesty of purpose that is all too rare in any art."

References

External links
 Presentation at the Whitney Museum of American Art

1928 paintings
Christian paintings
Kansas culture
Paintings by John Steuart Curry
Paintings in the collection of the Whitney Museum of American Art
Works about Kansas
Birds in art
Water in art